Mozaffar Kola (also Romanized as Moz̧affar Kolā) is a village in Lalehabad Rural District, Lalehabad District, Babol County, Mazandaran Province, Iran. At the 2006 census, its population was 364, in 93 families.

References 

Populated places in Babol County